The U.S.–MEFTA initiative started in 2003 with the purpose of creating a U.S.–Middle East Free Trade Area by 2013.

The U.S. objective with this initiative has been to gradually increase trade and investment in the Middle East, and to assist the Middle East countries in implementing domestic reforms, instituting the rule of law, protecting private property rights (including intellectual property), and creating a foundation for openness, economic growth, and prosperity.

Among the stated objectives are:

Actively supporting WTO membership of countries in the Middle East and Maghreb
Expanding the Generalized System of Preferencess that currently provides duty-free entry to the U.S. market for some 3,500 products from 140 developing economies
Negotiating Trade and Investment Framework Agreements that establish a framework for expanding trade and resolving outstanding disputes
Negotiating bilateral investment treaties with interested countries by obligating governments to treat foreign investors fairly and offering legal protection equal to domestic investors
Negotiating comprehensive free trade agreements with willing countries that demonstrate a commitment to economic openness and reform
Helping to target more than $1 billion of annual U.S. funding and spur partnerships with private organizations and businesses that support trade and development

Active agreements

US agreements
The United States currently has several bilateral free trade agreements with nations in the region.
 Bahrain–United States Free Trade Agreement
 Israel–United States Free Trade Agreement
 Jordan–United States Free Trade Agreement
 Morocco–United States Free Trade Agreement
 Oman–United States Free Trade Agreement

Middle Eastern agreements
Additionally many potential MEFTA states are already members of the multilateral Greater Arab Free Trade Area.

Other states are members of the multilateral Arab Maghreb Union.

The following, expected to constitute MEFTA, are not members of existing Middle Eastern agreements:

See also 

 Greater Middle East
 Middle East Partnership Initiative 
 List of Free Trade Agreements
 List of trade blocs
 Middle East economic integration

References

External links 
Official site
White House Press Release - 9 June 2004
U.S. Briefing at Department of State - 6 May 2005
White House Press Release - 17 October 2005

Proposed free trade agreements
MEFTA